Takydromus smaragdinus, the green grass lizard, is a species of lizard in the family Lacertidae.

Geographic range 
It is endemic to the Ryukyu Islands in southern Japan, including the Tokara Islands Takarajima and Kodakarajima, the Amami Islands and Okinawa Islands. The area of occupancy of all the islands combined is around 2600 km².

Activity 
Takydromus smaragdinus is diurnal. It preys on insects and spiders.

Reproduction 
The females lay several clutches of eggs in April to August with two eggs per clutch. The eggs hatch after about a month. The juveniles are left without parental care and reach maturity in a year.

Threats 
The IUCN lists the species as near threatened  due to invasive weasels and mongooses that have led to a decline in some subpopulations.

References

Takydromus
Reptiles described in 1887
Taxa named by George Albert Boulenger
Endemic reptiles of Japan